Mashkan-shapir (modern Tell Abu Duwari, Al Qadisyah Governorate, Iraq) was an ancient tell roughly  north of Nippur and around  southeast of Baghdad. The city god of Mashkan-shapir was Nergal and a temple named Meslam dedicated to him was built there.

History
Though occupied during the Uruk period, the town's first epigraphic appearance was during the Akkadian period in a minor context, and then during the Ur III period as a location for royal shepherds. A brick of Amar-Sin was also found at the site. Mashkan-shapir achieved prominence during the Old Babylonian period. This time of occupation is considered to begin with the construction of the city walls by Sin-Iddinam of Larsa. The city was abandoned during the reign of Samsu-iluna, successor to Hammurabi of the First Babylonian dynasty and not re-occupied until late in the first millennium. The city's demise was part of a general collapse and abandonment of sites in the region at that time.

After rising to importance under the Larsa city-state, Mashkan-shapir became part of the Babylonian empire after the defeat of Larsa by Hammurabi following a long siege. At the time, Babylon and Larsa were engaged in a struggle for dominance in the region.

Note that the modern name of the site is in some doubt. Other possible names are Ishan Chebir and Tell Naim. The Tell Abu Duwari identification was the first and is used in archaeological publications.

Archaeology

The site of Mashkan-shapir covers about 56 hectares being about 4 meters in elevation and it is divided into a four quarters by canals. It is especially important from an archaeological standpoint because it is a single level site. Most cities in the Ancient Near East have been built and rebuilt many times over history, obscuring our understanding of individual time periods.

Tell Abu Duwari was first noted, as site 639, in the Nippur survey of Robert McCormick Adams of the Oriental Institute at the University of Chicago. The site was excavated for a total of five months in three seasons between 1987 and 1990 by an American Schools of Oriental Research and National Geographic Society team led by Elizabeth Stone and Paul Zimansky. A key find was that of foundation deposits commemorating the city walls being built by Sin-Iddinam, which allowed the city to be identified. As part of the work, satellite images were taken and a complete surface-mapping was made using a kite lofted camera and coordinate markers.

Excavations at Mashkan-shapir ended with the invasion of Kuwait by Iraq in 1990, interrupting a planned long-term research program. Subsequently, the site has been heavily looted to the point where any further archaeological work would yield little results.

See also

 Cities of the ancient Near East

Notes

Further reading

External links
Year Named of Samsu-iluna at CDLI
New York Times article on the discovery of Mashkan-Shapir

Al-Qādisiyyah Governorate
Archaeological sites in Iraq
Former populated places in Iraq
Former monarchies